TRISPHAT (full name tris(tetrachlorocatecholato)phosphate(1−)) is an inorganic anion with the formula  often prepared as the tributylammonium or tetrabutylammonium ( salt. The anion features phosphorus(V) bonded to three tetrachlorocatecholate ligands.  This anion can be resolved into the axially chiral enantiomers, which are optically stable (the picture shows the Δ enantiomer).

The TRISPHAT anion has been used as a chiral shift reagent for cations. It improves the resolution of 1H NMR spectra by forming diastereomeric ion pairs.

Preparation
The anion is prepared by treatment of phosphorus pentachloride with tetrachlorocatechol followed by a tertiary amine gives the anion:
PCl5  +  3 C6Cl4(OH)2   →   H[P(O2C6Cl4)3]  +  5 HCl
H[P(O2C6Cl4)3]  +  Bu3N   →   Bu3NH+ [P(O2C6Cl4)3]−
Using a chiral amine, the anion can be readily resolved.

References

Organophosphates
Anions
Chloroarenes
Catechols
Phosphates
Nuclear magnetic resonance